Robert Alexander Milne (born 13 June 1960) is a former English cricketer.  Milne was a right-handed batsman who bowled right-arm medium pace.  He was born in Hackney, London.

Milne made his Minor Counties Championship debut for Cambridgeshire against Bedfordshire in 1985.  From 1985 to 1996, he represented the county in 31 Minor Counties Championship matches, the last of which against Bedfordshire.  He made his debut in the MCCA Knockout Trophy in 1987 against Cheshire.  From 1987 to 1991, he represented the county in 3 Trophy matches, the last of which came against Norfolk.

It was for Cambridgeshire that he made 2 List A appearances.  These came against Derbyshire in the 1987 NatWest Trophy and Kent in the 1991 NatWest Trophy.  In his 2 List A matches, he scored 2 runs at a batting average of 1.00, with a high score of 2, while in the field he took a single catch.

During his career, he also played a number of matches for Huntingdonshire between 1985 and 1997.

References

External links
Robert Milne at Cricinfo
Robert Milne at CricketArchive

1960 births
Living people
People from Hackney Central
Cricketers from Greater London
English cricketers
Cambridgeshire cricketers